This article is a partial list of people from São Tomé and Príncipe:

Music
José Vianna da Motta

Sports
Naide Gomes
D'Jamila Tavares

Writers
Sara Pinto Coelho
Caetano da Costa Alegre
Alda Neves da Graça do Espírito Santo